was a Japanese engineer who was influential in founding Busicom, driving the development of the Intel 4004 microprocessor, and later driving Sharp into the LCD calculator market.

Biography
Tadashi Sasaki was born on May 12, 1915 in Hamada City, Shimane Prefecture. Not much is known of Sasaki’s mother. His father was a former samurai from the garrison at Hamada Castle and a teacher. Initially, Sasaki desired to study modern Japanese literature, but he was encouraged by one of his school teachers to study science. He studied electrical engineering at Kyoto University, where he graduated in 1938. After graduation, he worked for a short time on circuit design at the Electrotechnical Laboratory—a preeminent research laboratory sponsored by the Ministry of Telecommunications. This position was short-lived as the outbreak of war in Japan meant Sasaki would be recruited for wartime work. Sasaki was assigned to an aircraft maker called Kawanishi, which was based in the western Japanese port of Kobe. Sasaki did research on vacuum tubes for use in telephones, wireless, and radar. In this position, he learned about the vertical integration of technology, an experience he found to be very valuable. Additionally, Sasaki worked to develop radar technologies as well as radar technologies to aid in the war effort. This research took him to Wurzburg, Germany, where he studied anti-radar technology. He later worked in Kobe Kogyo, the first Japanese company to manufacture transistors, and then in Hayakawa Electrical Industries, where he helped to develop electronic calculators. This eventually led him to obtain American patent licences to fabricate integrated chips and thus the first commercially successful pocket calculator. His frequent trips overseas to study the latest developments in semiconductor technologies earned him the popular nicknames "Rocket Sasaki" and "Mr. Rocket".

Intel 4004
Sasaki played a key role in the creation of the first microprocessor, the Intel 4004. Initially, he conceived of the idea of the chip and requests that Intel build it, for building better calculators. He was involved in the development of the Busicom 141-PF desktop calculator which led to the 4004's creation. He conceived of a single-chip CPU in 1968, when he discussed the concept at a brainstorming meeting that was held in Japan. 

Sasaki attributes the basic invention to break the calculator chipset into four parts with ROM (4001), RAM (4002), shift registers (4003) and CPU (4004) to an unnamed woman, a software engineering researcher from Nara Women's College, who was present at the meeting. Sasaki then had his first meeting with Robert Noyce from Intel in 1968, and presented the woman's four-division chipset concept to Intel and Busicom, providing the basis for the single-chip microprocessor design of the Intel 4004.

References

1915 births
2018 deaths
Japanese electrical engineers
Japanese centenarians
Men centenarians
Japanese inventors
Sharp Corporation people
People from Shimane Prefecture